Robert J. Lendlmayer von Lendenfeld (1858-1913) was an Austrian zoologist, alpinist, and traveler. He was also a notable spongiologist.

von Lendenfeld was one of a number of influential German-speaking residents  such as William Blandowski, Ludwig Becker, Hermann Beckler, Amalie Dietrich, Diedrich Henne, Gerard Krefft, Johann Luehmann, Johann Menge, Ludwig Preiss, Carl Ludwig Christian Rümker (a.k.a. Ruemker), Moritz Richard Schomburgk, Richard Wolfgang Semon, George Ulrich, Eugene von Guérard, Ferdinand von Mueller, Georg von Neumayer, and Carl Wilhelmi  who brought their "epistemic traditions" to Australia, and not only became "deeply entangled with the Australian colonial project", but also "intricately involved in imagining, knowing and shaping colonial Australia" (Barrett, et al., 2018, p. 2).

Works 
 1886: Über Coelenteraten der Südsee
 1888: Descriptive catalogue of the sponges in the Australian Museum, Sydney
 1890: Australia Felix
 1892: Australische Reise
 1894: Die Tetractinelliden der Adria: (Mit einem Anhange über die Lithistiden)
 1895: Report on the deep-sea fishes collected by H. M. S. Challenger during the years 1873-76
 1896: Aus den Alpen
 1896: Die Clavulina der Adria
 1899: Wissenschaftliche Ergebnisse der Reisen in Madagaskar und Ostafrika (mit Alfred Völtzkow, Hans Schinz, Hans Strahl, Hubert Ludwig, Henri de Saussure)
 1899: Die Hochgebirge der Erde
 1902: Neuseeland
 1902: Das grosse australische Wallriff
 1903: Das Tierreich
 1903: Porifera: Tetraxonia
 1908: Tetraxonia der deutschen Südpolar-Expedition, 1901-1903
 1913: Untersuchungen über die Skelettbildungen der Kieselschwämme: I. Die Mikrosklere der Caminus-Arten

Notes

References 
 Barrett, L., Eckstein, L., Hurley, A.W. & Schwarz A. (2018), "Remembering German-Australian Colonial Entanglement: An Introduction", Postcolonial Studies, Vol.21, No.1, (January 2018), pp. 1–5. 

1858 births
1913 deaths
Austrian zoologists
Spongiologists